The list of ship launches in 1902 includes a chronological list of ships launched in 1902.  In cases where no official launching ceremony was held, the date built or completed may be used instead.



References 

Sources

 

1902
1902 in transport
 Ship launches